KCYL is a Lampasas, Texas radio station, licensed to Lampasas, Texas, and is under ownership of Ronald K. Witcher. The station airs a News/Talk format. The station also airs local ministers and other local oriented programs on the station.

External links
Lampasas Radio

Country radio stations in the United States
CYL
Radio stations established in 1986
1986 establishments in Texas